Agate is a small community in the state of Washington, United States. It is located on southern Puget Sound on the north side of the entrance to Hammersley Inlet.

References
 Findlay, Jean Cammon, and Paterson, Robin, Mosquito Fleet of South Puget Sound, Arcadia Publishing (2008) .

Geography of Mason County, Washington